Jarmo Koski (2 July 1951 in Imatra, South Karelia) is a Finnish actor. He starred as Seppo Taalasmaa in the half-hour soap opera Salatut Elämät from 1999 to 2013 and briefly in 2017 and from 2020 to 2021.

Dubbed movies, Finnish voice 
He's also a voice actor for children cartoons and animated movies:

 Shrek 2 and Shrek the Third as King Harold
 A Bug's Life as Heimlich
 Alfred J. Kwak
 Various Winnie the Pooh films and series as Winnie the Pooh since the early 1990s
 The Toy Story franchise as Slinky
 Teletubbies as Tinky Winky
 Nick Knatterton as Nick Knatterton
 Blinky Bill as Mayor Pelican and other characters

References

External links
 Jarmo Koski at IMDb

1951 births
Living people
People from Imatra
Finnish male television actors
Finnish male voice actors
20th-century Finnish male actors
21st-century Finnish male actors